Pieterszoon may refer to:
 Piet Pieterszoon Hein, Dutch naval officer
 Jan Pieterszoon Coen, Governor-General of the Dutch East Indies
 Nicolaes Pieterszoon Berchem, Dutch painter